The 1996 Big Eight men's basketball tournament was held March 8–10 at Kemper Arena in Kansas City, Missouri.

Second-seeded Iowa State defeated #1 seed Kansas in the championship game, 56–55, to capture their first Big Eight men's basketball tournament and earn the conference's automatic bid to the 1996 NCAA tournament. This was the final Big Eight men's basketball tournament, as the members of the Big Eight Conference joined Texas, Texas Tech, Baylor, and Texas A&M to play in the inaugural Big 12 men's basketball tournament.

Bracket

References

Tournament
Big Eight Conference men's basketball tournament
Big Eight Conference men's basketball tournament
Big Eight Conference men's basketball tournament